The Ranch is the only album by the country music group The Ranch, fronted by Keith Urban. It was released by Capitol Nashville in 1997, and re-released in 2004 with two bonus tracks and re-titled Keith Urban in The Ranch.

At the ARIA Music Awards of 1997, the album was nominated for ARIA Award for Best Country Album.

Content
"Some Days You Gotta Dance" was later recorded by the Dixie Chicks on their 1999 album Fly. Their version, which features Urban on lead guitar, was released as a single in 2001. "Homespun Love" was later recorded by Steel Magnolia on their 2011 self-titled debut album, "Desiree" by David Nail on his 2011 album The Sound of a Million Dreams, and "Walkin' the Country" by Scotty McCreery on his 2012 debut Clear as Day.

Critical reception
William Ruhlmann of Allmusic rated it three stars out of five, comparing Urban's sound favorably to Rodney Crowell and saying, "He sounds modern instead, and the album reveals a broad, budding talent not far from fully flowering."

An uncredited review in Country Weekly gave the 2004 reissue four stars out of five, saying that it was "lacking his later degree of confidence and polish" but that "The songs are uniformly strong".

Track listing

Personnel

The Ranch
Keith Urban – lead vocals, lead guitar, acoustic guitar,  ganjo, keyboards, hand claps
Jerry Flowers – bass guitar, background vocals, hand claps
Peter Clarke – drums, percussion, hand claps

Guest musicians
Randy Flowers – hand claps on "Some Days You Gotta Dance"
Gary Gazzaway – horns on "Clutterbilly"
Tony Harrell – Hammond B-3 organ, Wurlitzer and glockenspiel on "Desiree", piano on "Ghost in the Guitar"
Jim Horn – horns on "Clutterbilly"
Charlie McMahon – didgeridoo on "Billy"
Johnny Neel – Hammond B-3 organ on "Just Some Love", "Freedom's Finally Mine", "Stuck in the Middle"
Richard Nord – guest vocals on "Homespun Love"
Buck Reid – pedal steel guitar on "Man of the House"
Eric Silver – fiddle on "Just Some Love"
Joe Spivey – fiddle on "My Last Name"
Vernon Rust – guest vocals on "Homespun Love"

Strings on "Ghost in the Guitar" performed by the Nashville String Machine, conducted by Carl Marsh, arranged by Carl Marsh, Monty Powell and Keith Urban.

Engineer: Greg Kane

Charts

References

1997 debut albums
Keith Urban albums
The Ranch (band) albums
Capitol Records albums